The Deceivers is a crime novel by the American writer Robert Aiello set in Pittsburgh, Pennsylvania.

It tells the story of Grant Montgomery, a retired mentalist who helps police solve the murder of a psychic scam artist. When he uncovers a national crime network, a ruthless public official targets him.

Sources
Contemporary Authors Online. The Gale Group, 2006.

External links
 Author's website
 Pittsburgh Post-Gazette book review

1999 American novels
American crime novels
Novels set in Pittsburgh
1999 debut novels